Kelamangalam railway station is one of the intermittent railway stations between Hosur railway station and Dharmapuri railway station.

Railway station
Kelamangalam railway station is located in Krishnagiri district of Tamil Nadu on Salem junction railway station to Bangalore city junction railway station line. This railway line is non-electrified single line, so many level crosses occur between passenger trains and express trains in the station. The Kelamangalam railway station is fifteen kilometres from Hosur railway station. Kelamangalam railway station is one of the intermittent railway station in Bengaluru to Salem line. This is a Passenger trains stoppage railway station. It belongs to South Western Railway, Bangalore Cy Jn. Neighbouring stations are Periyanaga Thumai, Hosur. A nearby major railway station is Bangalore Cy Jn and Airport is Bengaluru International Airport. Total  No express trains stop at this station.

Tourist places
Tourist places near by Kelamangalam are 
Bangalore     
Hogenakkal     
Savandurga     
Bheemeshwari     
MM Hills     
Around Kelamangalam village people are choosing passenger train transport for going to nearest place for lowest cost. And working people are using daily to go and from Hosur, Bengaluru and Dharmapuri by this passenger train transport. Some kind of people are gaining income by selling vegetables, fruits and some home remedies in this Passenger trains.

References

External links

Railway stations in Krishnagiri district
Bangalore railway division